Matrimony Blues was a 1926 short comedy silent film directed by Philadelphian director, Benjamin Stoloff. The film starred Lige Conley, Mildred June, and Spencer Bell.

External links

1926 films
American silent short films
Films directed by Benjamin Stoloff
Silent American comedy films
American black-and-white films
1926 short films
American comedy short films
1926 comedy films
1920s American films